The Glasgow Royal Concert Hall is an arts venue in the city of Glasgow, Scotland. The concert hall is operated by Glasgow's Concert Halls, which also runs Glasgow's City Halls and Old Fruitmarket.

The Lanarkshire Orchestral Society is a group of three concert bands and three String orchestras, based in Lanarkshire, Scotland. It was founded in 1958, by members of the then Director of Education.
 It has an age range of 8 to 23 years old.

Concerts
The Lanarkshire Orchestral Society holds a concert four times a year at the Hamilton Townhouse - twice for the concert bands and twice for the String orchestras. The Concerts are held during the easter period and during the christmas period.

In 2009, the Lanarkshire Orchestral Society held a special 50th Anniversary Concert at the Glasgow Royal Concert Hall in Glasgow, Scotland.

| Lanarkshire Intermediate Wind Band
| Jennifer Crate
| 2009
| 
Lanarkshire Senior Wind Band
| James McAleenan
|}

Honours
 Lanarkshire Intermediate Wind Band - National Wind Festival - Gold 2007.
 Lanarkshire Intermediate Wind Band - British Wind Festival - Silver April 20, 2007.

References

External links
 Official site

Audio clips
 Colonel Bogey - Performed by the Lanarkshire Preparatory Wind Band, Conducted by Caroline Bennie.
 Tequilla - Performed by the Lanarkshire Third Orchestra, conducted by Gary McBretney.
 Highland Cathedral - Performed by the Lanarkshire Intermediate Wind Band, Conducted by John Bryce.
 The carnival of Animals - Performed by the Lanarkshire Second Orchestra, Conducted by Jim McClean.
 The Death of Don Quixote - Performed by the Lanarkshire Senior Wind Band, Conducted by John Miller.
 Four scottish Dances Finale - Performed by the 	Lanarkshire String Orchestra, Conducted by Iain massey.

Musical groups established in 1957
British instrumental musical groups
Concert bands